Sean Michael Carroll (born October 5, 1966) is an American theoretical physicist and philosopher who specializes in quantum mechanics, cosmology, and philosophy of science. Formerly a research professor in the Walter Burke Institute for Theoretical Physics in the California Institute of Technology (Caltech) Department of Physics, he is currently an External Professor at the Santa Fe Institute, and the Homewood Professor of Natural Philosophy at Johns Hopkins University. He has been a contributor to the physics blog Cosmic Variance, and has published in scientific journals such as Nature as well as other publications, including The New York Times, Sky & Telescope and New Scientist. He is known for atheism, critique of theism and defense of naturalism. He is considered a prolific public speaker and science populariser. In 2007, Carroll was named NSF Distinguished Lecturer by the National Science Foundation.

He has appeared on the History Channel's The Universe, Science Channel's Through the Wormhole with Morgan Freeman, Closer to Truth (broadcast on PBS), and Comedy Central's The Colbert Report. Carroll is the author of Spacetime And Geometry, a graduate-level textbook in general relativity, and has also recorded lectures for The Great Courses on cosmology, the physics of time and the Higgs boson. He is also the author of four popular books: From Eternity to Here about the arrow of time, The Particle at the End of the Universe about the Higgs boson, The Big Picture: On the Origins of Life, Meaning, and the Universe Itself about ontology, and Something Deeply Hidden about the foundations of quantum mechanics. He began a podcast in 2018 called Mindscape, in which he interviews other experts and intellectuals coming from a variety of disciplines, including "[s]cience, society, philosophy, culture, arts and ideas" in general.  He has also published a YouTube video series entitled "The Biggest Ideas in the Universe" which provides physics instruction at a popular-science level but with equations and a mathematical basis, rather than mere analogy.  The series has become the basis of a new book series with the installment, "The Biggest Ideas in the Universe: Space, Time, and Motion", published in September 2022.

Career 
Carroll received his PhD in astronomy in 1993 from Harvard University, where his advisor was George B. Field. His dissertation was entitled Cosmological Consequences of Topological and Geometric Phenomena in Field Theories. He worked as a postdoctoral researcher at the Massachusetts Institute of Technology (MIT) and Kavli Institute for Theoretical Physics at the University of California, Santa Barbara and as an assistant professor at the University of Chicago until 2006 when he was denied tenure. He is the Homewood Professor of Natural Philosophy at Johns Hopkins University, teaching in both the Department of Philosophy and The Department of Physics and Astronomy.

Carroll has a B.S. in Astronomy, Astrophysics and philosophy from Villanova University in Pennsylvania.

In 2010, Carroll was elected fellow of the American Physical Society for "contributions to a wide variety of subjects in cosmology, relativity and quantum field theory, especially ideas for cosmic acceleration, as well as contributions to undergraduate, graduate and public science education". In 2014, he was awarded the Andrew Gemant Award by the American Institute of Physics for "significant contributions to the cultural, artistic or humanistic dimension of physics". In 2015, he was awarded a Guggenheim Fellowship.

He is also a very prolific public speaker, holding regular talk-show series like Mindscape, which he describes as "Sean Carroll hosts conversations with the world's most interesting thinkers", and The Biggest Ideas in the Universe. He also delivers public speeches as well as getting engaged in public debates in wide variety of topics.

Carroll has appeared on numerous television shows including The Colbert Report and Through the Wormhole. He also worked as a consultant in several movies like Avengers: Endgame and Thor: The Dark World. Besides consulting, Carroll worked as a voice actor in Earth to Echo.

Personal life 
Carroll is married to Jennifer Ouellette, a science writer and the former director of the Science & Entertainment Exchange.

Research 
Carroll has worked on a number of areas of theoretical cosmology, field theory and gravitation theory. His research papers include models of, and experimental constraints on, violations of Lorentz invariance; the appearance of closed timelike curves in general relativity; varieties of topological defects in field theory; and cosmological dynamics of extra spacetime dimensions. He has written extensively on models of dark energy and its interactions with ordinary matter and dark matter, as well as modifications of general relativity in cosmology. He has also worked on the foundations of quantum mechanics, especially the many-worlds interpretation, including a derivation of the Born rule for probabilities.

His most-cited work, "Is Cosmic Speed-Up Due To New Gravitational Physics?" (2003) was written with Vikram Duvvuri, Mark Trodden and Michael Turner. With over 1,900 citations, it helped pioneer the study of f(R) gravity in cosmology.

Carroll has also worked on the arrow of time problem. He and Jennifer Chen posit that the Big Bang is not a unique occurrence as a result of all of the matter and energy in the universe originating in a singularity at the beginning of time, but rather one of many cosmic inflation events resulting from quantum fluctuations of vacuum energy in a cold de Sitter space. They claim that the universe is infinitely old but never reaches thermodynamic equilibrium as entropy increases continuously without limit due to the decreasing matter and energy density attributable to recurrent cosmic inflation. They assert that the universe is "statistically time-symmetric", insofar as it contains equal progressions of time "both forward and backward". Some of his work has been on violations of fundamental symmetries, the physics of dark energy, modifications of general relativity and the arrow of time. Recently he started focusing on issues at the foundations of cosmology, statistical mechanics, quantum mechanics and complexity.

In 2017, Carroll presented an argument for rejecting certain cosmological models, including those with Boltzmann brains, on the basis that they are cognitively unstable: they cannot simultaneously be true and justifiably believed. The article was solicited as a contribution to a larger work on Current Controversies in Philosophy of Science.

Philosophical and religious views 
Carroll, while raised as an Episcopalian, is an atheist, or as he calls it, a "poetic naturalist". He turned down an invitation to speak at a conference sponsored by the John Templeton Foundation, because he did not want to appear to be supporting a reconciliation between science and religion.
In 2004, he and Shadi Bartsch taught an undergraduate course at the University of Chicago on the history of atheism. In 2012, he organized the workshop "Moving Naturalism Forward", which brought together scientists and philosophers to discuss issues associated with a naturalistic worldview. His article "Does the Universe Need God?" in The Blackwell Companion to Science and Christianity develops the claim that science no longer needs to posit a divine being to explain the existence of the universe. The article generated significant attention when it was discussed on The Huffington Post. Carroll received an "Emperor Has No Clothes" award at the Freedom From Religion Foundation Annual National Convention in October 2014.

His 2016 book The Big Picture: On the Origins of Life, Meaning and the Universe Itself develops the philosophy of poetic naturalism, the term he is credited with coining. The book talks about wide range of topics such as submicroscopic components of the universe, whether human existence can have meaning without God—and everything between the two.

Carroll's speeches on the philosophy of religion also generate interest as his speeches are often responded to and talked about by philosophers and apologists. Carroll believes that thinking like a scientist leads one to the conclusion that God does not exist. Carroll thinks that over four centuries of scientific progress have convinced most professional philosophers and scientists of the validity of naturalism. Carroll also asserts that the term methodological naturalism is an inaccurate characterisation of science, that science is not characterised by methodological naturalism but by methodological empiricism.

Carroll is a vocal atheist who has debated with Christian apologists such as Dinesh D'Souza and William Lane Craig. He occasionally takes part in formal debates and discussions about scientific, religious and philosophical topics with a variety of people.

Debates, dialogues and discussions 

Carroll has been involved in numerous public debates and discussions with other academics and commentators. In 2012, he gathered a number of well-known academics from a variety of backgrounds for a three-day seminar titled "Moving Naturalism Forward". The participants were Steven Weinberg, Richard Dawkins, Daniel C. Dennett, Jerry Coyne, Simon DeDeo, Massimo Pigliucci, Janna Levin, Owen Flanagan, Rebecca Goldstein, David Poeppel, Alex Rosenberg, Terrence Deacon and Don Ross with James Ladyman.

Also in 2012, Carroll teamed up with Michael Shermer to debate with Ian Hutchinson of MIT and author Dinesh D'Souza at Caltech in an event titled "The Great Debate: Has Science Refuted Religion?"

In 2014, Carroll participated in a highly anticipated debate with philosopher and Christian apologist William Lane Craig as part of the Greer-Heard Forum in New Orleans. The topic of debate was "The Existence of God in Light of Contemporary Cosmology".
In a podcast in 2018, Sam Harris engaged with Carroll. They discussed consciousness, the many-worlds view of quantum mechanics, the arrow of time, free will, facts and values, and other topics including moral realism.

Also in 2014, Carroll partook in a debate held by Intelligence Squared, the title of the debate was "Death is Not Final". Carroll teamed up with Steven Novella, a neurologist by profession and known for his skepticism,; the two argued against the motion. Their adversaries were Eben Alexander, neurosurgeon and an author, and Raymond Moody, a philosopher, author, psychologist and physician.

In 2017, Carroll took part in a discussion with B. Alan Wallace, a Buddhist scholar and monk ordained by the Dalai Lama. It was organized by an institution sponsored by the John Templeton Foundation. In this public dialogue, they discussed the nature of reality from spiritual and scientific viewpoints.

In 2018, Carroll and Roger Penrose held a symposium on the subject of The Big Bang and Creation Myths. The two also engaged in a dialogue in Sean Carroll's MindScape Podcast on its 28th episode.

Selected publications 
  Reprinted 2019.
  It tackles a fundamental open principle in physics: the arrow of time.
  It describes the hunt for and discovery of the Higgs boson at the Large Hadron Collider at CERN and was the 2013 winner of the Royal Society Winton Prize for Science Books.
 , where Carroll introduces the concept of poetic naturalism.
 
 
 Research publication list, from the INSPIRE-HEP digital library.

See also 

 List of cosmologists

References

External links 

 Oral history interview transcript with Sean Carroll on 4 January 2021, American Institute of Physics, Niels Bohr Library & Archives
 Carroll's web site, Preposterous Universe
 
 Dark Matter, Dark Energy: The Dark Side of the Universe, lectures at The Teaching Company.
 Video of Sean Carroll's panel discussion, "Quantum to Cosmos", answering the biggest questions in physics today, Part 1 at Perimeter Institute's Quantum to Comos (Q2C) festival
 Video introduction to Sean Carroll's lectures "The Biggest Ideas in the Universe", 2020
 Interview on The Colbert Report
 

1966 births
Living people
21st-century American physicists
American textbook writers
American male writers
American cosmologists
American skeptics
Harvard Graduate School of Arts and Sciences alumni
California Institute of Technology faculty
University of Chicago faculty
American male bloggers
American bloggers
Science bloggers
Bayesian statisticians
Critics of creationism
Critics of parapsychology
American relativity theorists
Scientists from Philadelphia
Fellows of the American Physical Society
20th-century atheists
21st-century atheists
Former Anglicans
21st-century American non-fiction writers
American podcasters
MIT Center for Theoretical Physics alumni
21st-century American philosophers
American atheism activists